In enzymology, a tetrahydrodipicolinate N-acetyltransferase is an enzyme that catalyzes the chemical reaction

acetyl-CoA + (S)-2,3,4,5-tetrahydropyridine-2,6-dicarboxylate + H2O  CoA + L-2-acetamido-6-oxoheptanedioate

The 3 substrates of this enzyme are acetyl-CoA, (S)-2,3,4,5-tetrahydropyridine-2,6-dicarboxylate, and H2O, whereas its two products are CoA and L-2-acetamido-6-oxoheptanedioate.

This enzyme belongs to the family of transferases, specifically those acyltransferases transferring groups other than aminoacyl groups.  The systematic name of this enzyme class is acetyl-CoA:(S)-2,3,4,5-tetrahydropyridine-2,6-dicarboxylate N2-acetyltransferase. Other names in common use include tetrahydrodipicolinate acetylase, tetrahydrodipicolinate:acetyl-CoA acetyltransferase, acetyl-CoA:L-2,3,4,5-tetrahydrodipicolinate N2-acetyltransferase, acetyl-CoA:(S)-2,3,4,5-tetrahydropyridine-2,6-dicarboxylate, and 2-N-acetyltransferase.  This enzyme participates in lysine biosynthesis.

References

 

EC 2.3.1
Enzymes of unknown structure